Prior to its uniform adoption of proportional representation in 1999, the United Kingdom used first-past-the-post for the European elections in England, Scotland and Wales. The European Parliament constituencies used under that system were smaller than the later regional constituencies and only had one Member of the European Parliament each.

The constituency of Tyne South and Wear was one of them.

It consisted of the Westminster Parliament constituencies (on their 1974 boundaries) of Blaydon, Gateshead East, Gateshead West, Jarrow, South Shields, Sunderland North, Sunderland South, and Tynemouth.

Member of the European Parliament

Results

References

External links
 David Boothroyd's United Kingdom Election Results

European Parliament constituencies in North East England (1979–1999)
Politics of Tyne and Wear
1979 establishments in England
1984 disestablishments in England
Constituencies established in 1979
Constituencies disestablished in 1984